Kilan Adawand was the name of a royal Gilite clan roaming in Khankha, Gilan. The most prominent members of the clan were; Hindu and Khashuya, the sons of Umkar, Ismail ibn Mardujin, Sarijin ibn Jilyar, and Mastar ibn Filmard.

Sources 
 

History of Gilan
Clans
Gilaks
Iranian families